Elias Ahde (born 6 March 1996) is a Finnish professional footballer who plays as striker for Kokkolan Palloveikot.

References

1996 births
Living people
Finnish footballers
Seinäjoen Jalkapallokerho players
SJK Akatemia players
FC Jazz players
FC Haka players
JJK Jyväskylä players
Kokkolan Palloveikot players
Turun Palloseura footballers
Veikkausliiga players
Ykkönen players
Kakkonen players
Association football forwards